Since its foundation in 1941, Philippine Airlines has suffered more than 20 aircraft crashes, terrorist attacks and aircraft hijackings. Most of these accidents and incidents involved propeller-driven aircraft, and prior to the 1980s.

Incidents and accidents

Hijackings 

 On December 30, 1952, after takeoff from Laoag International Airport, an armed man forced his way into the cockpit. He pulled out a .45-caliber pistol and demanded that the plane be brought to Xiamen, in mainland China. The captain took over control from the co-pilot and put the plane into a steep dive. The hijacker did not lose his balance, and shot and killed the captain, forcing the co-pilot to retake control. A flight attendant had come up to the cockpit to find out what was going on; as he knocked, the hijacker shot him twice through the cockpit door, killing him. Both planes chased the DC-3 and sprayed machine gun fire. The pilot managed to escape until he met with other Nationalist planes, who forced the flight to land at Quemoy. At Quemoy the hijacker was arrested.
 On November 6, 1968, four hijackers demanded money.
 On March 30, 1971, six hijackers hijacked a Philippines Airlines BAC One-Eleven en route to Davao City and ordered the pilot to divert the plane to Guangzhou, China. En route, the pilot requested for a refuelling stop in Hong Kong where 20 passengers where freed. The plane proceeded to Guangzhou where the hijackers disembarked and requested asylum. The rest of the passengers where freed by Chinese authorities and the aircraft returned to Manila the following day.
 On October 11, 1973, three hijackers surrendered after attempting to hijack a Philippines Airlines BAC One-Eleven in Hong Kong
 On February 25, 1975, two hijackers attempted to hijack a Philippines Airlines BAC One-Eleven bound from Davao to Manila. They surrendered.
 On October 7, 1975, one hijacker on a Philippines Airlines BAC One-Eleven bound from Davao to Manila demanded to be taken to Libya. He surrendered.
 On April 7, 1976, a BAC 1-11 was hijacked by rebels for seven days, demanding money and the release of imprisoned rebels. The aircraft ended up in Benghazi, Libya.
 On May 21, 1976, Philippine Airlines Flight 116, a BAC One-Eleven en route from Davao to Manila, was hijacked by six rebels, demanding $375,000 and a plane to fly them to Libya. Negotiations between the police and the hijackers lasted for 2 days until May 23, when authorities stormed the plane. A gun battle ensued and lasted for hours. The hijackers subsequently detonated a hand grenade in the cabin, which burned the aircraft and killed 10 passengers and 3 hijackers. The remaining three hijackers were caught and were executed by a firing squad.
 On July 12, 1980, a hijacker of a Philippine Airlines flight from Manila to Cebu demanded money and wanted to be flown to Libya. The aircraft was stormed and the hijacker arrested.
 On May 21, 1982, a man with a hand grenade, demanding better conditions for sugar workers and coconut farmers, held 109 people hostage aboard a Philippine Airlines jet bound from Bacolod to Cebu. The plane was on the ground at Cebu. The unidentified hijacker also demanded pay raises for teachers and back pay for veterans.
 On May 25, 2000, Philippine Airlines Flight 812, en route from Davao to Manila, was hijacked by a man with marital problems. The hijacker was pushed out of the aircraft before arrival by a flight attendant and used a homemade parachute in escaping, with none of the other passengers and crew being injured or killed.

References

 Philippine Airlines#Accidents and incidents

 
Aviation accidents and incidents in the Philippines